The Pliezhausen brooch (also known as the Pliezhausen disc, Pliezhausen bracteate or Pliezhausen disc brooch) is a gold disc decorated with figures that was discovered in 1928 during excavations in Pliezhausen, in the county of Reutlingen in Germany, in the grave of a wealthy Alemannic woman dating to the early 7th century and which was the front of a disc fibula. It is one of the few artifacts of the Early Middle Ages which portrays the figures of people.

Discovery 
During construction work in the vicinity of the street known as Pliezhauser Alamannenstraße, graves from an Alemannian grave field kept coming to light. In 1928, during the excavation of what became designated as Grave 1, that of a wealthy woman, the Pliezhausen equestrian brooch was discovered as part of the grave goods. The disc, made from a thin gold plate, was the ornamental cover for a disc fibula with a bronze pin as the fastener. Other grave goods included a bronze ring, fragments of bronze wire and 13 pearls.

The Pliezhausen brooch is displayed in the Württemberg State Museum in the Alter Schloss in Stuttgart.

Similar Finds 

Several comparable finds from the early Middle Ages are known, such as from the noble ship graves of Sutton Hoo in England and Vendel and Valsgärde in Sweden. The disc from Sutton Hoo corresponds most exactly to the Pliezhausen disc, with the exception of the mirror-image arrangement. It is one of the few naturalistic and figurative representations that have survived from the early Middle Ages and provides valuable information on the mythical and religious imagination of the pagan Alemanni at the transition to Christianity.

Bibliography 
  
 Kurt Böhner: Die Goldscheibe von Pliezhausen. In: Gemeinde Pliezhausen (Hrsg): 900 Jahre Pliezhausen 1092-1992 - Heimat zwischen Neckar und Schönbuch. Gemeinde Pliezhausen, 1992.

Weblinks 
 Gemeinde Pliezhausen (archive of the original)
 

Archaeological artifacts
Alemanni
Reutlingen (district)